Diagnostic microscopy may refer to:
Histopathology of tissues
Smear test of free cells or small tissue fragments